Marco Domeniconi (born 29 January 1984) is a former Sammarinese footballer who last played as a midfielder for Folgore Falciano and formerly the San Marino national team.

Career
Domeniconi made his debut for San Marino on 28 April 2004 in a friendly match against Liechtenstein, which finished as a 1–0 win.

Career statistics

International

References

External links
 
 
 

1984 births
Living people
Sammarinese footballers
San Marino youth international footballers
San Marino under-21 international footballers
San Marino international footballers
Sammarinese expatriate footballers
Sammarinese expatriate sportspeople in Italy
Expatriate footballers in Italy
Association football midfielders
A.S.D. Riccione 1929 players
F.C. Fiorentino players
S.S. Folgore Falciano Calcio players
Serie D players